This is the results breakdown of the local elections held in Galicia on 8 May 1983. The following tables show detailed results in the autonomous community's most populous municipalities, sorted alphabetically.

Overall

City control
The following table lists party control in the most populous municipalities, including provincial capitals (shown in bold). Gains for a party are displayed with the cell's background shaded in that party's colour.

Municipalities

El Ferrol del Caudillo
Population: 87,691

La Coruña
Population: 231,721

Lugo
Population: 72,574

Orense
Population: 94,346

Pontevedra
Population: 64,184

Santiago de Compostela
Population: 82,404

Vigo
Population: 261,331

References

Galicia
1983